Orphnolechia neastra is a moth in the family Depressariidae. It was described by Edward Meyrick in 1915. It is found in Guyana.

The wingspan is about 11 mm. The forewings are purple blackish with a white line from the middle of the costa to three-fifths of the dorsum, somewhat angulated in the middle. The hindwings are dark fuscous becoming blackish posteriorly. There is a moderate irregular white spot in the disc beyond the middle.

References

Moths described in 1915
Orphnolechia